Erica Chantal Ash (born September 19, 1977) is an American actress, comedian, singer and model. She was a cast member on the sketch comedy programs MADtv and The Big Gay Sketch Show, and she later starred in the Starz sitcom Survivor's Remorse.

Early life 
Ash was born in Florida to Donald and Diann Ash. Her parents were both in the military, leading the family to relocate often, moving to Germany and other parts of the world. She attended a performing-arts school in Atlanta, Georgia, during her youth. Ash planned on becoming a doctor, graduating from Emory University, in Atlanta with a degree in pre-medicine, and prepared to attend medical school. However, after a trip to Japan, where she became a backup singer and a runway model, Ash decided to pursue a career in entertainment.

Career

The Big Gay Sketch Show 
In February 2006, Ash landed multiple job opportunities in Broadway shows like The Lion King and a two-week job in Germany. After returning from Germany, she successfully auditioned for the cable television comedy show The Big Gay Sketch Show. Ash was a cast member for only two seasons. While she was a cast member, Ash had to split her time between the first season of the sketch show and The Lion King. Some of her characters included LaTanya, an uncouth, loudmouthed fitness instructor who teaches classes with a "Chicago-style" twist (i.e. Chicago-style yoga, Chicago-style pilates).

MadTV 
Ash joined the cast of MADtv in 2008 as a feature performer for the 14th season, along with Matt Braunger, Eric Price, and Lauren Pritchard. She became the fifth African-American female cast member in the show's history (Debra Wilson, Daniele Gaither, Nicole Randall Johnson, and Daheli Hall were the first four). Of the five female African-American cast members, Ash and Hall are the only two who were never promoted to a repertory player. Ash remained a featured member of the MADtv cast during the show's 14th and final season on FOX.

Characters

Impressions

Filmography 
The following is a brief list of Erica Ash's television and voice acting career projects as compiled by the Internet Movie Database.

Film appearances

Television appearances

Video games

References

External links 

Erica Ash's Official Site 

Living people
Actresses from Florida
African-American female models
American female models
African-American models
American film actresses
American television actresses
American sketch comedians
American video game actresses
American voice actresses
American women comedians
Emory University alumni
Female models from Florida
1977 births
21st-century American singers
21st-century American comedians
21st-century American actresses
20th-century African-American women singers
21st-century African-American women
21st-century African-American musicians